This is a list of compositions by Arthur Honegger.

List of works by main categories

Opus numbers originate from the complete catalogue by Harry Halbreich.

Orchestral music
Symphonies :
1930 : H  75 First Symphony in C
1941 : H 153 Second Symphony for strings and trumpet in D (Symphony for Strings)
1946 : H 186 Third Symphony (Symphonie liturgique)
1946 : H 191 Fourth Symphony in A (Deliciae basiliensis)
1950 : H 202 Fifth Symphony in D (Di tre re)
Symphonic movements :
1924 : H  53 Pacific 231 (Symphonic Movement No. 1)
1928 : H  67 Rugby (Symphonic Movement No. 2)
1933 : H  83 Symphonic Movement No. 3
Concertos :
1924 : H  55 Concertino for piano and orchestra
1929 : H  72 Concerto for cello and orchestra in C major 
1948 : H 196 Concerto da camera, for flute, English horn and strings
Vocal orchestral music :
1932 : H  82 Le grand étang for voice and piano (or orchestra)
1937 : H 107 Les Mille et une nuits (The Thousand and One Nights) for Soprano, Tenor and orchestra
1937 : H 120 Jeunesse for voice and piano (or orchestra), or for unison chorus
1938 : H 132 L'Alarme for voice, chorus and orchestra, lost
1944 : H 177 Selzach Passion, incomplete
1947 : H 192 Mimaamaquim (Psaume CXXX) for voice and piano (or orchestra)
???? : H 222 La nuit est si profonde for voice and orchestra
Miscellaneous :
1917 : H  10 Prélude for Aglavaine et Sélysette
1917 : H  16 Le chant de Nigamon
1920 : H  31 Pastorale d'été
1921 : H  38 Horace victorieux, (Horace Triumphant) symphonie mimée
1923 : H  47 Chant de joie (Song of Joy)
1929 : H  74 J'avais un fidèle amant, variations for string quartet or string orchestra
1935 : H  92 Radio-panoramique, symphonic poem
1936 : H 102 Nocturne
1936 : H 105 Largo
1940 : H 141 Grad us for woodwinds, brass, and percussion
1942 : H 162 Le grand barrage
1945 : H 182 Sérénade à Angélique
1951 : H 203 Suite archaïque
1951 : H 204 Monopartita
1951 : H 207 Toccata on a theme of Campra, a movement from the collaborative work La guirlande de Campra
???? : H 218 Chevauchée
???? : H 219 Pathétique
???? : H 221 Allegretto
Adaptions :
1920 : H  27 Orchestration of a Mussorgsky song, lost
1923 : H 48a Prelude for the Tempest, after a work of Shakespeare
1923 : H 48b 2 Chants d'Ariel for voice and orchestra, adaptation of H 48
1925 : H 60a Orchestral Suite, adaption of L'Impératrice aux Rochers, H 60
1926 : H 61a Orchestral Suite, adaption of Phaedre, H  61
1928 : H 66a Blues, adaptation of Roses de métal, H 66
1928 : H 68a Suite, adaptation of Les Noces d'Amour et de Psyché, H 68
1928 : H 68b Prelude et fugue, adaptation of Les Noces d'Amour et de Psyché, H 68
1948 : H 71a Prélude, fugue et postlude, music from Amphion
1936 : H 81a Prélude, arioso et fughette sur le nom de BACH (String Orchestra version of H 81 for piano solo)
1934 : H 88a Orchestral Suite, adaption of Les Misérables
1943 : H 167a 2 Suites, music from Mermoz
1945 : H 174a Schwyzer Faschttag, suite from L'Appel de la montagne

Chamber music
String Quartets
1917 : H  15 String Quartet No. 1 in C minor
1929 : H  74 J'avais un fidèle amant, variations for string quartet or string orchestra
1935 : H 103 String Quartet No. 2 in D
1937 : H 114 String Quartet No. 3 in E
Sonatas and sonatinas
1912 : H   3 Sonate for violin and piano in D minor (No. 0)
1912 : H   4 Sonate for cello and piano, lost
1918 : H  17 First sonata for violin and piano in C sharp minor (First violin sonata)
1919 : H  24 Second sonata for violin and piano in B (Second violin sonata)
1920 : H  28 Sonata for viola and piano
1920 : H  29 Sonatina for two violins in G
1920 : H  32 Sonata for cello and piano in D minor
1922 : H  42 Sonatina for clarinet and piano
1932 : H  80 Sonatina for violin and cello in E minor
1940 : H 143 Sonata for solo violin in D minor
Vocal chamber music
1920 : H  30 "Pâques à New-York", (Easter in New York) after Blaise Cendrars, for mezzo-soprano and string quartet
1924 : H  54 Chanson de Ronsard for voice, flute and string quartet, or for voice and piano
1926 : H  63 Trois Chansons de La Petite Sirène (Three Songs of the little Siren) for voice, flute and string quartet, or for voice and piano
1939 : H 136a O Salutaris for voice and piano (or harp), or for voice, organ, piano and optional harp, adaptation of H 136
Miscellaneous :
1914 : H   6 Trio for violin, cello, and piano in F minor
1917 : H  13 Rhapsody for 2 flutes, clarinet and piano, or for 2 violins, viola and piano
1919 : H  22 Musique d'ameublement for flute, clarinet, trumpet, string quartet and piano
1920 : H  33 Hymn for 10 string instruments, in B minor
1921 : H  36 Cinéma-fantaisie for violin and piano, in collaboration with Darius Milhaud
1921 : H  39 Danse de la chèvre (The Goat Dance)
1929 : H  43 Three Counterpoints for flute, oboe, violin and cello
1929 : H 43a Suite for 2 pianos, adaption of Three Counterpoints, H 43
1925 : H  56 Prelude and Blues for 4 harps, lost
1925 : H  59 Hommage du trombone exprimant la tristesse de l'auteur absent for trombone and piano
1929 : H  73 Berceuses pour la Bobcisco for violin, flute (or violin), trumpet (or viola), cello and piano
1932 : H  79 Prelude pour la Sous-basse (Contrabass) et Piano
1934 : H  89 Petite Suite for 2 instruments and piano
1940 : H 139 Partita for 2 pianos
1941 : H 147 L'Ombre de la Ravine for string quartet, flute and harp (The Shadow of the Ravine)
1945 : H 178 O temps suspends ton vol for violin and piano
1945 : H 179 Morceau de concours for violin and piano
1945 : H 180 Paduana for cello
1947 : H 193 Intrada for C trumpet and piano
1953 : H 211 Romance for flute and piano
1929 : H 214 Arioso for violin and piano
1943 : H 215 Andante for 4 Ondes Martenots
???? : H 216 Colloque for flute, celesta, violin and viola

Music for piano
Original works :
1910 : H   1 3 Pieces (Scherzo, Humoresque, Adagio)
1916 : H   8 Toccata and variations
1919 : H  23 3 Pieces (Prélude, Hommage à Maurice Ravel, Danse)
1920 : H  25 7 Pièces brèves
1920 : H  26 Sarabande for L'Album des Six
1923 : H  52 Le Cahier romand
1928 : H  69 Hommage à Albert Roussel
1932 : H  81 Prélude, arioso, and fughetta on the name BACH
1935 : H  95 Berceuse, from the collaborative work Bal des petits lits blancs
1937 : H 115 Scenic Railway, from collaborative work Parc d'attractions Expo 1937
1941 : H 145 Petits Airs sur une basse célèbre
1943 : H 173 2 Esquisses
???? : H 213 Très modéré
Adaptions :
1925 : H 60b La Neige sur Rome, arrangement from L'Impératrice aux Rochers, H 60
1929 : H 60c Suite (Partita) for piano, possibly in collaboration with Andrée Vaurabourg, adaption of L'Impératrice aux Rochers, H 60
1931 : H 76a Suite, adaptation of Les Aventures du roi Pausole, H 76
1943 : H 166b 3 Pièces de Le capitaine Fracasse, music from Le Capitaine Fracasse
1945 : H 183a Piéces de 'Un ami viendra ce soir, music form Un Ami viendra ce soir

Ballets
1918 : H  19 Le dit des jeux du monde
1920 : H  34 Vérité ? Mensonge ? (Truth? Lies?), partially lost
1921 : H  35 La noce massacrée (The Ruined Wedding) from the collaborative work Les mariés de la tour Eiffel (The Wedding on the Eiffel Tower)
1921 : H  38 Horace victorieux, symphonie mimée
1922 : H  40 Skating Rink, choreographic symphony
1922 : H  46 Fantasio
1925 : H  58 Sous-marine (mimed scene)
1928 : H  66 Roses de métal, lost
1928 : H  68 Les noces d'amour et de Psyché (The Wedding of Cupid and Psyche), arrangement of music by Johann Sebastian Bach
1929 : H  71 Amphion, melodrama by Paul Valéry
1934 : H  85 Sémiramis, melodrama by Paul Valéry
1935 : H  96 Icare (Icarus)
1937 : H 113 Un oiseau blanc s'est envolé (A White Bird Has Flown Away)
1937 : H 123 Le cantique des cantiques (The Song of Songs)
1940 : H 142 La naissance des couleurs (The Birth of Colors)
1941 : H 154 Le mangeur de rêves (The Dream Eater), lost
1943 : H 174 L'appel de la montagne (Tha Call of the Mountain)
1945 : H 180 Chota Roustaveli, in collaboration with Alexander Tcherepnin and Tibor Harsányi, piano arrangement extent
1946 : H 189 Sortilèges (Magic Spell), lost
1950 : H 200 De la musique, lost

Operas
1903 : H   I Philippa, libretto by composer
1904 : H  II Sigismond, lost
1907 : H III La Esméralda, unfinished
1918 : H  20 La mort de Sainte Alméenne (The Death of Saint Alméenne), for voice and piano, orchestration in 2005 by Nicolas Bacri assisted by Harry Halbreich
1925 : H 57b Judith, 'opéra sérieux', libretto by René Morax
1926 : H  65 Antigone, 'tragédie musicale', libretto by Jean Cocteau based on Sophocles

Operettas
1930 : H  76 Les aventures du roi Pausole, libretto by Albert Willemetz
1931 : H  78 La Belle de Moudon
1937 : H 128 Les Petites Cardinales, libretto by Albert Willemetz
1937 : H 108 L'Aiglon, 'drame musical' (in collaboration with Jacques Ibert)

Oratorios
1907 : H  IV Oratorio du calvaire, lost
1918 : H  18 Cantique de Pâques, for soloists, female chorus & orchestra
1921 : H  37 Le Roi David (King David) libretto by René Morax, Paris version for orchestra in 1923
1927 : H 57c Judith, libretto by René Morax
1931 : H  77 Cris du monde, (Cries of the World) libretto by René Bizet
1935 : H  99 Jeanne d'Arc au bûcher, libretto by Paul Claudel, version with prologue in 1941
1938 : H 131 La danse des morts, (The Dance of the Dead) libretto by Paul Claudel
1939 : H 135 Nicolas de Flue
1953 : H 212 Une Cantate de Noël (A Christmas cantata)

Incidental music
1919 : H  21 La danse macabre, lost
1922 : H  41 Saül for trumpet, cello and percussion, incomplete
1922 : H  45 Antigone for oboe and harp
1925 : H  60 L'impératrice aux rochers (The Empress of the Rocks)
1926 : H  61 Phaedre
1929 : H  48 The Tempest, for the play by William Shakespeare, partially lost
1923 : H  49 Liluli for voice, chorus, piccolo, cello and piano
1925 : H 57a Judith
1926 : H  62 Pour le cantique de Salomon (For the Song of Solomon)
1933 : H  84 Les douze coups de minuit, incomplete
1936 : H 104 La marche sur la Bastille
1937 : H 111 Prelude á la Mort de Jaurès from the show Liberté, in collaboration with Arthur Hoérée, lost
1937 : H 119a Two songs from the La construction d'une cité
1941 : H 146 La Mandragore
1941 : H 147 L'ombre de la ravine
1941 : H 149 Les suppliantes
1941 : H 150 800 meters, lost
1941 : H 151 La ligne d'horizon
1943 : H 163 Pasiphaé
1943 : H 165 Le soulier de satin, livret de Paul Claudel
1943 : H 172 Sodom and Gomorrah
1944 : H 175 Charles le téméraire (Charles the Bold)
1946 : H 187 Prométhée (Prometheus)
1946 : H 190 Hamlet
1947 : H 194 Oedipus
1948 : H 195 L'état de siège, by Albert Camus, lost
1949 : H 198 Marche contre la mort, lost
1950 : H 199 Tête d'or
1951 : H 208 On ne badine pas avec l'amour, lost
1952 : H 210 Oedipus Rex
???? : H 217 Introduction et danse
???? : H 220 Vivace

Music for radio
1940 : H 140 Christopher Columbus
1944 : H 176 Battements du monde
1949 : H 197 Saint François d'Assise
1951 : H 209 La Rédemption de François Villon

Film music
1922 : H  44 La Roue by Abel Gance
1927 : H  64 Napoléon by Abel Gance
1934 : H  86 Rapt, in collaboration with Arthur Hoérée
1934 : H  87 L'idée, animation film by Berthold Bartosch
1934 : H  88 Les Misérables
1934 : H  90 Cessez le feu
1934 : H  91 Le roi de la camargue, in collaboration with Alexis Roland-Manuel, incomplete
1935 : H  93 Der Dämon des Himalayas
1935 : H  94 Crime et chatiment
1935 : H  98 L’Équipage, in collaboration with Maurice Thiriet
1936 : H 100 Les mutinés de l’Elseneur
1936 : H 101 Mayerling, in collaboration with Maurice Jaubert
1936 : H 106 Nitchevo, in collaboration with Casimir Oberfeld
1937 : H 109 Mademoiselle Docteur
1937 : H 110 Marthe Richard au service de la France
1937 : H 112 Liberté, in collaboration with Arthur Hoérée, lost
1937 : H 116 La citadelle du silence, in collaboration with Darius Milhaud
1937 : H 117 Regain, partially lost
1937 : H 121 Visages de la France, partially lost
1937 : H 124 Miarka ou la fille à l’ourse, in collaboration with Tibor Harsányi
1937 : H 125 Passeurs d'hommes, in collaboration with Arthur Hoérée, lost
1937 : H 126 Les bâtisseurs, in collaboration with Arthur Hoérée
1938 : H 129 Pygmalion, in collaboration with William Axt, partially lost
1938 : H 130 L'Or dans la montagne, in collaboration with Arthur Hoérée
1939 : H 134 Le Déserteur by Moguy
1939 : H 136 Cavalcade d'amour by Bernard, in collaboration with Darius Milhaud, lost
1942 : H 155 Chant de libération, lost
1942 : H 156 Le Journal tombe à cinq heures by Lacombe
1942 : H 157 Huit Hommes dans un château by Pottier, in collaboration with Arthur Hoérée
1942 : H 158 Les Antiquités de l'Asie occidentale by Membrin
1942 : H 159 Musiques pour France-actualités, lost
1942 : H 160 La Boxe en France by Gasnier-Raymond, in collaboration with André Jolivet
1942 : H 161 Secrets by Blanchart, lost
1943 : H 164 Callisto, ou la petite nymphe de Diane, in collaboration with Alexis Roland-Manuel, piano arrangement extent
1943 : H 166 Le Capitaine Fracasse by Abel Gance, lost
1943 : H 167 Mermoz by Cuny
1943 : H 170 La Nativité by Marty, incomplete
1943 : H 171 Un Seul Amour by Blanchart
1945 : H 183 Un Ami viendra ce soir by Bernard
1946 : H 185 Les Démons de l'aube by Allégret, in collaboration with Arthur Hoérée
1946 : H 188 Un Revenant by Christian-Jacques, in collaboration with Arthur Hoérée, in which Honegger plays the composer
1950 : H 201 Bourdelle by Lucot
1951 : H 205 La Tour de Babel by Rony, in collaboration with Tibor Harsányi and Arthur Hoérée, lost
1951 : H 206 Paul Claudel by Gillet

Art songs
Original works :
1906 : H   V 3 Songs, lost
1908 : H  VI 6 Sonatas
1910 : H   2 Adagio, lost
???? : H   5 2 Songs, lost
1916 : H   7 4 Poems
1916 : H   9 3 Poèmes de Paul Fort
1917 : H  11 Nature morte
1917 : H  12 6 Poèmes d'Apollinaire
1923 : H  51 6 Poésies de Jean Cocteau
1929 : H  70 Vocalise-etude
1932 : H  82 Le grand étang for voice and piano or orchestra
1935 : H  97 Fièvre jaune for voice (or voices) and piano
1937 : H 118 Tuet's weh?
1937 : H 120 Jeunesse for voice and piano (or orchestra), or for unison chorus
1937 : H 122 Armistice for voice (or unison chorus) and piano
1937 : H 127 Chansons de René Kerdyk
1938 : H 133 Hommage au travail
1940 : H 138 3 Poèmes de Claudel
1940 : H 144 3 Psalms
1941 : H 148 5 Petit cours de morale
1941 : H 152 Saluste du Bartas
1943 : H 168 Céline
1943 : H 169 Panis angelicus
1944 : H 184 Chansons pour voix grave
1947 : H 192 Mimaamaquim (Psaume CXXX) for voice and piano (or orchestra)
Adaptions :
1936 : H 106a 2 Chansons de Nitchevo, adaption of Nitchevo, H 106
1937 : H 124a 2 Chansons du Miarka ou la fille à l'ourse, music from Miarka ou la fille à l’ourse, H 124
1939 : H 136a O Salutaris for voice and piano (or harp), or for voice, organ, piano and optional harp, adaptation of H 136
1943 : H 166a 4 Chansons pour Le capitaine Fracasse, music from Le Capitaine Fracasse, H 166, No. 1 lost
1943 : H 171a 2 Romances sentimentales, music from Un Seul Amour

Miscellaneous works
1907 : H  Ia Overture to Philippa, 2 voices and piano
1907 : H IIIa Overture to La Esméralda, 2 voices and piano
1917 : H  14 Fugue et choral for organ
1923 : H  50 Chanson de Fagus for soprano, chorus and piano
1911 : H 110a Orgue dans l'église for organ, music used in Marthe Richard au service de la France, H 110
1937 : H 126a Hymne du bâtiment, music from Les bâtisseurs, H 126
1939 : H 137 Possèdes-tu, pauvre pécheur for unison chorus, harmonium or piano
1945 : H 183b Chant de la délivrance for voices and piano, music form Un Ami viendra ce soir

Books
L'incantation aux fossiles
Je suis compositeur

List of works by opus numbers

Opus numbers originate from the complete catalogue by Harry Halbreich.

1903 : H   I Philippa, opera, libretto by composer
1907 : H  Ia Overture to Philippa, 2 voices and piano
1904 : H  II Sigismond, opera, lost
1907 : H III La Esméralda, unfinished
1907 : H IIIa Overture to La Esméralda, 2 voices and piano
1907 : H  IV Oratorio du calvaire, lost
1908 : H   V 3 Songs, lost
1908 : H  VI 6 Sonatas for voice and piano
1910 : H   1 3 Pieces for piano
1910 : H   2 Adagio for voice and piano, lost
1912 : H   3 Sonata for violin and piano in D minor (No. 0)
1912 : H   4 Sonata for cello and piano, lost
???? : H   5 2 Songs, lost
1914 : H   6 Trio for violin, cello, and piano in F minor
1916 : H   7 4 Poems for voice and piano
1916 : H   8 Toccata and variations
1916 : H   9 3 Poèmes de Paul Fort for voice and piano
1917 : H  10 Prélude for Aglavaine et Sélysette
1917 : H  11 Nature morte for voice and piano
1917 : H  12 6 Poèmes d'Apollinaire for voice and piano
1917 : H  13 Rhapsody for 2 flutes, clarinet and piano, or for 2 violins, viola and piano
1917 : H  14 Fugue et choral for organ
1917 : H  15 String Quartet No. 1 in C minor
1917 : H  16 Le Chant de Nigamon
1918 : H  17 First sonata for violin and piano in C sharp minor (First violin sonata)
1918 : H  18 Cantique de Pâques, for soloists, female chorus & orchestra
1918 : H  19 Le Dit des jeux du monde
1918 : H  20 La Mort de Sainte Alméenne (The Death of Saint Alméenne), for voice and piano, orchestration in 2005 by Nicolas Bacri assisted by Harry Halbreich
1919 : H  21 La Danse macabre, lost
1919 : H  22 Musique d'ameublement for flute, clarinet, trumpet, string quartet and piano
1919 : H  23 Three pieces for piano (Prélude, Hommage à Maurice Ravel, Danse)
1919 : H  24 Second sonata for violin and piano in B (Second violin sonata)
1920 : H  25 7 Pièces brèves
1920 : H  26 Sarabande for piano
1920 : H  27 Orchestration of a Mussorgsky song, lost
1920 : H  28 Sonata for viola and piano
1920 : H  29 Sonatina for two violins in G
1920 : H  30 Pâques à New-York, (Easter in New York) after Blaise Cendrars, for mezzo-soprano and string quartet
1920 : H  31 Pastorale d'été
1920 : H  32 Sonata for cello and piano in D minor
1920 : H  33 Hymn for 10 string instruments, in B minor
1920 : H  34 Vérité ? Mensonge ? (Truth? Lies?), partially lost
1921 : H  35 La Noce massacrée (The Ruined Wedding) from the collaborative work Les mariés de la tour eiffel (The Couple Married on the Eiffel Tower)
1921 : H  36 Cinéma-fantaisie for violin and piano, in collaboration with Darius Milhaud
1921 : H  37 Le Roi David (King David) libretto by René Morax, version parisienne pour orchestre en 1923
1921 : H  38 Horace victorieux, (Horace Triumphant) symphonie mimée
1921 : H  39 Danse de la chèvre (The Goat Dance)
1922 : H  40 Skating Rink, choreographic symphony
1922 : H  41 Saül for trumpet, cello and percussion, incomplete
1922 : H  42 Sonatina for clarinet and piano
1929 : H  43 Three Counterpoints for flute, oboe, violin and cello
1929 : H 43a Suite for 2 pianos, adaption of Three Counterpoints, H 43
1922 : H  44 La Roue de Abel Gance
1922 : H  45 Antigone for oboe and harp
1922 : H  46 Fantasio
1923 : H  47  Chant de joie (Song of Joy)
1929 : H  48 The Tempest, for the play by William Shakespeare, partially lost
1923 : H 48a Prelude for the Tempest, after the play by Shakespeare
1923 : H 48b 2 Chants d'Ariel for voice and orchestra, adaptation of H 48
1923 : H  49 Liluli for voice, chorus, piccolo, cello and piano
1923 : H  50 Chanson de Fagus for soprano, chorus and piano
1923 : H  51 6 Poésies de Jean Cocteau for voice and piano
1923 : H  52 Le Cahier romand
1923 : H  53 Pacific 231 (Symphonic Movement No. 1)
1924 : H  54 Chanson de Ronsard for voice, flute and string quartet, or for voice and piano
1924 : H  55 Concertino for piano and orchestra
1925 : H  56 Prelude and Blues for 4 harps, lost
1925 : H 57a Judith, incidental music
1925 : H 57b Judith, serious opera, libretto by René Morax
1927 : H 57c Judith, oratorio, libretto by René Morax
1925 : H  58 Sous-marine (mimed sccene)
1925 : H  59 Hommage du trombone exprimant la tristesse de l'auteur absent for trombone and piano
1925 : H  60 L'Impératrice aux rochers (The Empress of the Rocks)
1925 : H 60a Orchestral Suite, adaption of L'Impératrice aux Rochers, H 60
1925 : H 60b La Neige sur Rome, arrangement from L'Impératrice aux Rochers, H 60
1929 : H 60c Suite (Partita) for piano, possibly in collaboration with Andrée Vaurabourg, adaption of L'Impératrice aux Rochers, H 60
1926 : H  61 Phaedre
1926 : H 61a Orchestral Suite, adaption of Phaedre, H  61
1926 : H  62 Pour le cantique de Salomon (For the Song of Solomon)
1926 : H  63 Trois Chansons de La Petite Sirène (Three Songs of the little Siren) for voice, flute and string quartet, or for voice and piano
1927 : H  64 Napoléon de Abel Gance
1926 : H  65 Antigone, libretto by Jean Cocteau based on Sophocles
1928 : H  66 Roses de métal, lost
1928 : H 66a Blues, adaptation of Roses de métal, H 66
1928 : H  67 Rugby (Symphonic Movement No. 2)
1928 : H  68 Les Noces d'Amour et de Psyché (The Wedding of Cupid and Psyche), arrangement of music by Johann Sebastian Bach
1928 : H 68a Suite, adaptation of Les Noces d'Amour et de Psyché, H 68
1928 : H 68b Prelude et fugue, adaptation of Les Noces d'Amour et de Psyché, H 68
1928 : H  69 Hommage à Albert Roussel
1929 : H  70 Vocalise-etude for voice and piano
1929 : H  71 Amphion, melodrama by Paul Valéry
1948 : H 71a Prélude, fugue et postlude, music from Amphion
1929 : H  72 Concerto for cello and orchestra in C major 
1929 : H  73 Berceuses pour la Bobcisco for violin, flute (or violin), trumpet (or viola), cello and piano
1929 : H  74 J'avais un fidèle amant, variations for string quartet or string orchestra
1930 : H  75 First Symphony in C
1930 : H  76 Les Aventures du roi Pausole, libretto by Albert Willemetz
1931 : H 76a Suite for piano, adaptation of Les Aventures du roi Pausole, H 76
1931 : H  77 Cris du monde, (Cries of the World) libretto by René Bizet
1931 : H  78 La Belle de Moudon
1932 : H  79 Prelude pour la Sous-basse (Contrebasse) et piano
1932 : H  80 Sonatina for violin and cello in E minor
1932 : H  81 Prélude, arioso, and fughetta on the name BACH
1936 : H 81a Prélude, arioso et fughette sur le nom de BACH (String Orchestra version of H 81 for piano solo)
1932 : H  82 Le grand étang for voice and piano (or orchestra)
1933 : H  83 Symphonic Movement No. 3
1933 : H  84 Les douze coups de minuit, incomplete
1934 : H  85 Sémiramis, melodrama by Paul Valéry
1934 : H  86 Rapt, in collaboration with Arthur Hoérée
1934 : H  87 L'idée, film d'animation de Berthold Bartosch
1934 : H  88 Les Misérables
1934 : H 88a Orchestral Suite, adaption of Les Misérables
1934 : H  89 Petite Suite for 2 instruments and piano
1934 : H  90 Cessez le feu
1934 : H  91 Le roi de la camargue, in collaboration with Alexis Roland-Manuel, incomplete
1935 : H  92 Radio-panoramique, symphonic poem
1935 : H  93 Der Dämon des Himalayas
1935 : H  94 Crime et chatiment
1935 : H  95 Berceuse for piano, from the collaborative work Bal des petits lits blancs
1935 : H  96 Icare (Icarus)
1935 : H  97 Fièvre jaune for voice (or voices) and piano
1935 : H  98 L’Équipage, in collaboration with Maurice Thiriet
1935 : H  99 Jeanne d'Arc au Bûcher, libretto by Paul Claudel, version with prologue in 1941
1936 : H 100 Les mutinés de l’Elseneur
1936 : H 101 Mayerling, in collaboration with Maurice Jaubert
1936 : H 102 Nocturne for orchestra
1935 : H 103 String Quartet No. 2 in D
1936 : H 104 La marche sur la Bastille
1936 : H 105 Largo for orchestra
1936 : H 106 Nitchevo, in collaboration with Casimir Oberfeld
1936 : H 106a 2 Chansons de Nitchevo for voice and piano, adaption of Nitchevo, H 106
1937 : H 107 Les Mille et une nuits (The Thousand and One Nights) for Soprano, Tenor and orchestra
1937 : H 108 L'Aiglon (in collaboration with Jacques Ibert)
1937 : H 109 Mademoiselle Docteur
1937 : H 110 Marthe Richard au service de la France
1911 : H 110a Orgue dans l'église for organ, music used in Marthe Richard au service de la France, H 110
1937 : H 111 Prelude á la Mort de Jaurès from the show Liberté, in collaboration with Arthur Hoérée, lost
1937 : H 112 Liberté, in collaboration with Arthur Hoérée, lost
1937 : H 113 Un Oiseau blanc s'est envolé (A White Bird Has Flown Away)
1937 : H 114 String Quartet No. 3 in E
1937 : H 115 Scenic Railway, from collaborative work Parc d'attractions Expo 1937
1937 : H 116 La citadelle du silence, in collaboration with Darius Milhaud
1937 : H 117 Regain, partially lost
1937 : H 118 Tuet's weh? for voice and piano
1937 : H 119a Two songs from the La Construction d'une cité
1937 : H 120 Jeunesse for voice and piano (or orchestra), or for unison chorus
1937 : H 121 Visages de la France, partially lost
1937 : H 122 Armistice for voice (or unison chorus) and piano
1937 : H 123 Le Cantique des cantiques (The Song of Songs)
1937 : H 124 Miarka ou la fille à l’ourse, in collaboration with Tibor Harsányi
1937 : H 124a 2 Chansons du Miarka ou la fille à l'ourse for voice and piano, music from Miarka ou la fille à l’ourse, H 124
1937 : H 125 Passeurs d'hommes, in collaboration with Arthur Hoérée, lost
1937 : H 126 Les bâtisseurs, in collaboration with Arthur Hoérée
1937 : H 126a Hymne du bâtiment, music from Les bâtisseurs, H 126
1937 : H 127 Chansons de René Kerdyk for voice and piano
1937 : H 128 Les Petites Cardinales, libretto by Albert Willemetz
1938 : H 129 Pygmalion, in collaboration with William Axt, partially lost
1938 : H 130 L'Or dans la montagne, in collaboration with Arthur Hoérée
1938 : H 131 La Danse des morts, (The Dance of the Dead) libretto by Paul Claudel
1938 : H 132 L'Alarme for voice, chorus and orchestra, lost
1938 : H 133 Hommage au travail for voice and piano
1939 : H 134 Le Déserteur de Moguy
1939 : H 135 Nicolas de Flue
1939 : H 136 Cavalcade d'amour de Bernard, in collaboration with Darius Milhaud, lost
1939 : H 136a O Salutaris for voice and piano (or harp), or for voice, organ, piano and optional harp, adaptation of H 136
1939 : H 137 Possèdes-tu, pauvre pécheur for unison chorus, harmonium or piano
1940 : H 138 3 Poèmes de Claudel for voice and piano
1940 : H 139 Partita for 2 pianos
1940 : H 140 Christopher Columbus
1940 : H 141 Grad us for woodwinds, brass, and percussion
1940 : H 142 La Naissance des couleurs (The Birth of Colors)
1940 : H 143 Sonata for solo violin in D minor
1940 : H 144 3 Psalms for voice and piano
1941 : H 145 Petits Airs sur une basse célèbre
1941 : H 146 La Mandragore
1941 : H 147 L'Ombre de la Ravine for string quartet, flute and harp (The Shadow of the Ravine)
1941 : H 148 5 Petit cours de morale for voice and piano
1941 : H 149 Les Suppliantes
1941 : H 150 800 Meters, lost
1941 : H 151 La Ligne d'horizon
1941 : H 152 Saluste du Bartas for voice and piano
1941 : H 153 Second Symphony for strings and trumpet in D (Symphony for Strings)
1941 : H 154 Le Mangeur de rêves (The Dream Eater), lost
1942 : H 155 Chant de libération, lost
1942 : H 156 Le Journal tombe à cinq heures de Lacombe
1942 : H 157 Huit Hommes dans un château de Pottier, in collaboration with Arthur Hoérée
1942 : H 158 Les Antiquités de l'Asie occidentale de Membrin
1942 : H 159 Musiques pour France-actualités, lost
1942 : H 160 La Boxe en France de Gasnier-Raymond, in collaboration with André Jolivet
1942 : H 161 Secrets de Blanchart, lost
1942 : H 162 Le Grand Barrage
1943 : H 163 Pasiphaé
1943 : H 164 Callisto, ou la petite nymphe de Diane, in collaboration with Alexis Roland-Manuel, piano arrangement extent
1943 : H 165 Le Soulier de satin, livret de Paul Claudel
1943 : H 166 Le Capitaine Fracasse de Abel Gance, lost
1943 : H 166a 4 Chansons pour Le capitaine Fracasse for voice and piano, music from Le Capitaine Fracasse, H 166, No. 1 lost
1943 : H 166b 3 Pièces de Le capitaine Fracasse for piano, music from Le Capitaine Fracasse
1943 : H 167 Mermoz de Cuny
1943 : H 167a 2 Suites for orchestra, music from Mermoz
1943 : H 168 Céline for voice and piano
1943 : H 169 Panis angelicus for voice and piano
1943 : H 170 La Nativité de Marty, incomplete
1943 : H 171 Un Seul Amour de Blanchart
1943 : H 171a 2 Romances sentimentales for voice and piano, music from Un Seul Amour
1943 : H 172 Sodom and Gomorrah
1943 : H 173 2 Esquisses for piano
1943 : H 174 L'Appel de la montagne (Tha Call of the Mountain)
1945 : H 174a Schwyzer Faschttag, orchestral suite from L'Appel de la montagne
1944 : H 175 Charles le téméraire (Charles the Bold)
1944 : H 176 Battements du monde
1944 : H 177 Selzach Passion, incomplete
1945 : H 178 O temps suspends ton vol for violin and piano
1945 : H 179 Morceau de concours for violin and piano
1945 : H 180 Chota Roustaveli, in collaboration with Alexander Tcherepnin and Tibor Harsányi, piano arrangement extent
1945 : H 181 Paduana for cello
1945 : H 182 Sérénade à Angélique for orchestra
1945 : H 183 Un Ami viendra ce soir de Bernard
1945 : H 183a Piéces de 'Un ami viendra ce soir for piano, music form Un Ami viendra ce soir
1945 : H 183b Chant de la délivrance for voices and piano, music form Un Ami viendra ce soir
1944 : H 184 Chansons pour voix grave for voice and piano
1946 : H 185 Les Démons de l'aube d'Allégret, in collaboration with Arthur Hoérée
1946 : H 186 Third Symphony (Symphonie liturgique)
1946 : H 187 Prométhée (Prometheus)
1946 : H 188 Un Revenant de Christian-Jacques, in collaboration with Arthur Hoérée
1946 : H 189 Sortilèges (Magic Spell), lost
1946 : H 190 Hamlet
1946 : H 191 Fourth Symphony in A (Deliciae basiliensis)
1947 : H 192 Mimaamaquim (Psaume CXXX) for voice and piano (or orchestra)
1947 : H 193 Intrada for Trumpet and Piano
1947 : H 194 Oedipus
1948 : H 195 L'État de siège, by Albert Camus, lost
1948 : H 196 'Concerto da camera, for flute, English horn and strings
1949 : H 197 Saint François d'Assise
1949 : H 198 Marche contre la mort, lost
1950 : H 199 Tête d'or
1950 : H 200 De la musique, lost
1950 : H 201 Bourdelle de Lucot
1950 : H 202 Fifth Symphony in D (Di tre re)
1951 : H 203 Suite archaïque
1951 : H 204 Monopartita
1951 : H 205 La Tour de Babel de Rony, in collaboration with Tibor Harsányi and Arthur Hoérée, lost
1951 : H 206 Paul Claudel de Gillet
1951 : H 207 Toccata on a theme of Campra, from collaborative work La Guirlande de Campra
1951 : H 208 On ne badine pas avec l'amour, lost
1951 : H 209 La Rédemption de François Villon
1952 : H 210 Oedipus Rex
1953 : H 211 Romance for flute and piano
1953 : H 212 Une Cantate de Noël (A Christmas Cantata)
???? : H 213 Très modéré for piano
1929 : H 214 Arioso for violin and piano
1943 : H 215 Andante for 4 Ondes Martenots
???? : H 216 Colloque for flute, celesta, violin and viola
???? : H 217 Introduction et danse
???? : H 218 Chevauchée
???? : H 219 Pathétique
???? : H 220 Vivace
???? : H 221 Allegretto
???? : H 222 La nuit est si profonde for voice and orchestra

References 

Honegger, Arthur, List of compositions by